The Gallant Bob Stakes is a Grade II American Thoroughbred horse race for three years olds, over a distance of six furlongs on the dirt held annually in September at Parx Casino and Racing racetrack in Bensalem, Pennsylvania.  The event currently carries a purse of $300,000.

History 
The race was inaugurated in 1979 as the Gallant Bob Handicap after the horse Gallant Bob who was the first Pennsylvania based horse to earn an Eclipse Award in 1975. The inaugural even was run with conditions of four year olds and older and was held in January. 

The event had a lengthy absence of 11 years of twelve years between 1987 and 1998 and when the event resumed in 1999 conditions were changed that the event was only for three year olds.

In 2013 the event was upgraded to a Grade III and in 2019 the event was upgraded to a Grade II.

Records
Speed record: 
 6 furlongs – 1:07.51 - Royal Currier (2011)
 7 furlongs – 1:22.40 - Georgeandthedragon (1981)
 
Margins: 
  lengths – Royal Currier (2011)

Most wins by a jockey  
 2 – Eibar Coa (2004, 2009)
 2 – Stewart Elliott  (2010, 2011)
 2 – Jose Luis Flores (2001, 2002)
 2 – John Neid Jr. (1979, 1984)
 2 – Joel Rosario (2019, 2021)
 2 – John R. Velazquez (2017, 2022)
Most wins by a trainer

 2 – Scott A. Lake (2002, 2009)
 2 – Guadalupe Preciado (2014, 2022)

Most wins by an owner

 No owner has won this race more than once

Winners

See also
 List of American and Canadian Graded races

References

Graded stakes races in the United States
Horse races in Pennsylvania
Grade 2 stakes races in the United States
Recurring sporting events established in 1979
Parx Casino and Racing
1979 establishments in Pennsylvania
Flat horse races for three-year-olds